On Fire is the debut album by the American hip hop band Stetsasonic. It was released in 1986 via Tommy Boy Records. It was released on compact disc for the first time in 2001, with three bonus tracks.

Production
On Fire was one of the first rap albums to combine live band instrumentation with traditional hip hop production.

Critical reception
Trouser Press wrote that "the sound of On Fire is hard and spare: one-at-a-time raps over rhythm tracks (including human beat box noises) with sporadic bits of music added." The Washington Post thought that "Stetsasonic does the now-traditional rap/metal duel on 'Rock De La Stet' and cops a reggae rhythm occasionally, but the sextet is at its best when it simply sets out to 'Bust That Groove'."

In 1998, the album was selected as one of The Source's 100 Best Rap Albums.

Track listing

Charts

References

External links
Unofficial lyrics listing by track

Stetsasonic albums
1986 debut albums
Tommy Boy Records albums